Eva López (born 27 November 1969) is a former synchronized swimmer from Spain. She competed in the women's solo competition at both the 1988 and 1992 Summer Olympics.

References 

1969 births
Living people
Spanish synchronized swimmers
Olympic synchronized swimmers of Spain
Synchronized swimmers at the 1988 Summer Olympics
Synchronized swimmers at the 1992 Summer Olympics